Brunt is a surname. Notable people with the surname include:

Chris Brunt, Northern Irish football player
David Brunt, British meteorologist
Dominic Brunt, English actor
John Brunt, soldier in World War II who was posthumously awarded the Victoria Cross
John Brunt V.C. (public house), the pub that bears his name
Jon Brunt (born 1974), American curler
Katherine Brunt, English cricketer and 2006 England women's Cricketer of the Year
Martin Brunt, crime correspondent for Sky News
Maureen Brunt (1928–2019), Australian economist and professor
Maureen Clark née Brunt, American Olympic curler
Peter Brunt, ancient historian at Oxford University
Stephen Brunt, Canadian sports journalist
Tony Brunt (born 1947), New Zealand journalist, activist and politician.
Van Brunt House, historic home in Miccosukee, Florida

Fictional characters:
Abraham "Brom" van Brunt, fictional character in Washington Irving's short story The Legend of Sleepy Hollow
Liquidator Brunt, character in Star Trek: Deep Space Nine
Brunt, remote-controlled drone of the Transformer Trypticon